Janela (Portuguese for "window") is a settlement in the eastern part of the island of Santo Antão, Cape Verde. It is situated on the Atlantic coast, 4 km southeast of Pombas and 14 km northeast of the island capital Porto Novo The central village, Pontinha, lies on a rocky peninsula. More villages are situated in the valley of the river Ribeira da Janela. The national road from Porto Novo to Pombas (EN1-SA03) passes through Janela.

The easternmost point of Santo Antão, Ponta Salina, lies 4 km southeast of Pontinha. 2 km east of the village is the headland Ponta do Tumbo with the lighthouse  Farol de Fontes Pereira de Melo.

See also
List of villages and settlements in Cape Verde

References

External links
Photos of Janela and its valley at ecaboverde.com 

Villages and settlements in Santo Antão, Cape Verde
Paul, Cape Verde
Populated coastal places in Cape Verde